Salem Saeed Salem (Arabic:سالم سعيد سالم) (born 6 September 1996) is an Emirati footballer who plays as a forward.

External links

References

Emirati footballers
1993 births
Living people
Al Wahda FC players
Baniyas Club players
Al Dhafra FC players
Emirates Club players
Al Hamriyah Club players
Al Urooba Club players
Dibba Al-Hisn Sports Club players
Al Jazirah Al Hamra Club players
Place of birth missing (living people)
UAE First Division League players
UAE Pro League players
Association football forwards